Corrado Capece (died 1482) was a Roman Catholic prelate who served as Archbishop of Benevento (1467–1482).

Biography
On 30 Oct 1467, Corrado Capece was appointed during the papacy of Pope Paul II as Archbishop of Benevento.
He served as Archbishop of Benevento until his death in 1482.

References

External links and additional sources
 (for Chronology of Bishops) 
 (for Chronology of Bishops) 

15th-century Roman Catholic archbishops in the Kingdom of Naples
Bishops appointed by Pope Paul II
1482 deaths